Neal Hines (August 30, 1950 – July 7, 2019) was an American politician who served in the Iowa House of Representatives from the 41st district from 1975 to 1979.

He died on July 7, 2019, in Ames, Iowa at age 68.

References

1950 births
2019 deaths
Democratic Party members of the Iowa House of Representatives
20th-century American politicians